Kross may refer to:

Kross (surname)
Kross (KDE), scripting framework for KDE 4
Kris Kross, American teenage rap duo
Kross SA, Polish bicycle manufacturer

See also 
 Gross (disambiguation)